Muswellbrook Shire is a local government area in the Upper Hunter region of New South Wales, Australia. The Shire is situated adjacent to the New England Highway and the Hunter railway line.

Muswellbrook Shire was established on 1 July 1979 from the amalgamation of the Municipality of Muswellbrook with the adjacent Denman Shire, which had been called Muswellbrook Shire between 1907 and 1968.

The Mayor of the Muswellbrook Shire Council is Cr. Steven Reynolds.

Main towns and villages 

The Shire includes Muswellbrook, Denman, Baerami, McCullys Gap, Martindale, Muscle Creek, Sandy Hollow, Widden and Wybong.

Coal Mining 
Muswellbrook started as coal mining town in late 1800s and began open cut mining in 1944. The oldest coal was opened in 1906.

Heritage listings
The Muswellbrook Shire has a number of heritage-listed sites, including:
 Denman, 4883 Jerrys Plains Road: Merton
 Muswellbrook, Denman Road: Rous Lench
 Muswellbrook, 132 Bridge Street: Weidmann Cottage
 Muswellbrook, 142-144 Bridge Street: Loxton House
 Muswellbrook, 178, 180-188 Bridge Street: Eatons Group
 Muswellbrook, 710 Denman Road: Edinglassie
 Muswellbrook, Hunter Terrace: St Alban's Anglican Church
 Muswellbrook, Main Northern railway: Muswellbrook railway station

Demographics
At the 2011 census, there were  people in the Muswellbrook Shire local government area, of these 51.7 per cent were male and 48.3 per cent were female. Aboriginal and Torres Strait Islander people made up 5.4 per cent of the population, which was significantly higher than the national and state averages of 2.5 per cent. The median age of people in the Muswellbrook Shire was 34 years, which was lower than the national median of 37 years. Children aged 0 – 14 years made up 22.8 per cent of the population and people aged 65 years and over made up 10.6 per cent of the population. Of people in the area aged 15 years and over, 47.0 per cent were married and 11.8 per cent were either divorced or separated.

Population growth in the Muswellbrook Shire between the 2001 census and the 2006 census was 3.25 per cent; and in the subsequent five years to the 2011 census, population growth was 3.64 per cent. When compared with total population growth of Australia for the same periods, being 5.78 per cent and 8.32 per cent respectively, population growth in the Muswellbrook Shire local government area was approximately half the national average. The median weekly income for residents within the Muswellbrook Shire was marginally higher than the national average.

At the 2011 census, the proportion of residents in the Muswellbrook Shire local government area who stated their ancestry as Australian or Anglo-Saxon exceeded 81 per cent of all residents (national average was 65.2 per cent). In excess of 68% of all residents in the Muswellbrook Shire nominated a religious affiliation with Christianity at the 2011 census, which was considerably higher than the national average of 50.2 per cent. Meanwhile, as at the census date, compared to the national average, households in the Muswellbrook Shire local government area had a significantly lower than average proportion (4.3 per cent) where two or more languages are spoken (national average was 20.4 per cent); and a significantly higher proportion (89.7 per cent) where English only was spoken at home (national average was 76.8 per cent).

Council

Current composition and election method
Muswellbrook Shire Council is composed of twelve Councillors elected proportionally as a single ward. All Councillors are elected for a fixed four-year term of office. The Mayor is elected by the Councillors at the first meeting of the council. The most recent election was held on 11 January 2022 and the makeup of the council is as follows:

The current Council, elected in 2022, in order of election, is:

Mayors 
The following is a list of mayors since the Shire of Denman amalgamated with the Municipality of Muswellbrook to form Muswellbrook Shire Council on 1 July 1979.

References